Joaquin Arambula (born May 17, 1977) is an American politician currently serving in the California State Assembly. He is a Democrat representing the 31st Assembly District, which encompasses southern and western Fresno County, including the cities of Sanger, Reedley, Orange Cove, and the west side of Fresno.

Arambula was elected to the Assembly in a 2016 special election to replace former Assemblymember Henry Perea, who resigned to work as a lobbyist for PhRMA.

He is a member of the California Latino Legislative Caucus. Before being elected to the Assembly, he was an emergency department physician. He is the son of former 31st District Assemblyman Juan Arambula.

Arambula was arrested on December 10, 2018, on suspicion of willful cruelty to a child, a misdemeanor under California domestic violence statutes. The assemblymember thanked the teachers at his daughter's school and police officers “for doing their job” in starting the investigation. One of his daughters had alleged that her father hit her on the face while he was wearing a ring. During trial, photos were shown to jurors that showed a 1-inch bruise on the child's right temple. On the witness stand during his trial, his daughter largely described the incident as an accident. In May 2019, a Fresno jury found Arambula not guilty.

2016 California State Assembly

2018 California State Assembly

2020 California State Assembly

References

External links 
 
 Campaign website

1977 births
21st-century American politicians
Bowdoin College alumni
Hispanic and Latino American state legislators in California
Living people
Democratic Party members of the California State Assembly
People from Delano, California
People from Kingsburg, California